Skejby Sygehus or Aarhus University Hospital, Skejby, was a  university hospital in Aarhus, Denmark from 1988 to 2018. 

In 2011, Skejby Sygehus became part of Aarhus University Hospital. In 2012, construction of "Det Nye Universitetshospital" (The New University Hospital), or DNU for short, a new large headquarter complex for Aarhus University Hospital, commenced. The new hospital complex is situated adjacent to Skejby Sygehus, and at the completion, Skejby Sygehus was fused with DNU in late 2018.

Defunct hospitals in Aarhus
Hospitals established in 1988
1988 establishments in Denmark
Aarhus N